WQLQ (99.9 FM) is a radio station licensed to Benton Harbor, Michigan targeting the South Bend, Indiana market.  WQLQ is owned by Mid-West Family Broadcasting. Its signal is regularly heard as far as Chicago, Illinois, and as far east as Battle Creek, Michigan

As of June 2011, the station has re-imaged from Cat Country 99-9 to Real Country 99-Nine.

Previous to the country format, the then-WHFB-FM acted as a local station serving the Benton Harbor/St. Joseph area, with beautiful music and adult contemporary music formats.

In September 2015, Schurz Communications, which previously held a minority interest in Douglas Road Radio, agreed to acquire full ownership of the company. The transaction is part of the $442.5 million acquisition of Schurz' broadcast interests, including WHFB-FM, by Gray Television. Though Gray initially intended to keep Schurz' radio stations, on November 2, it announced that Mid-West Family Broadcasting would acquire WHFB-FM and Schurz' other South Bend radio stations for $5.5 million. Mid-West Family already owns several stations in the Benton Harbor-St. Joseph area, where the station's city of license is located. The sale to Mid-West was consummated on February 16, 2016.

Upon acquiring the station, Midwest Family announced on October 4, 2016, that WHFB would flip to Top 40/CHR as "Live 99.9" the following Tuesday, the 11th. The station began stunting with TV show theme songs on October 7, 2016, which ended with the noon launch on the aforementioned date. The callsign was changed on October 12, 2016 to WQLQ to match.

WQLQ-HD2
On January 30, 2019, WQLQ launched a classic rock format on its HD2 subchannel, branded as "95.7 The Lake" (simulcast on translator W239CJ 95.7 FM Benton Harbor).

WQLQ-HD3
On June 28, 2021, WQLQ launched a country music format, branded as "96.1 The Ton" (simulcast on translator W241AD 96.1 FM South Bend, Indiana).

Translators
WQLQ relays its HD2 and HD3 subchannels on the following translators:

Previous logo

References

Michiguide.com - WHFB-FM History

External links

QLQ
Radio stations established in 1947
Contemporary hit radio stations in the United States
1947 establishments in Michigan
Benton Harbor, Michigan